Christchurch earthquake may refer to a number of earthquakes that affected Christchurch, New Zealand.

Christchurch earthquakes 
 1869 Christchurch earthquake on 5 June 1869
 2010 Canterbury earthquake on 4 September 2010
 2011 Christchurch earthquake on 22 February 2011
 June 2011 Christchurch earthquake on 13 June 2011
 February 2016 Christchurch earthquake on 14 February 2016

Earthquakes elsewhere causing damage in Christchurch 
 1855 Wairarapa earthquake on 23 January 1855
 1888 North Canterbury earthquake on 1 September 1888
 1901 Cheviot earthquake on 16 November 1901
 2016 Kaikoura earthquake on 14 November 2016

See also
 List of earthquakes in New Zealand
 Canterbury earthquake (disambiguation)